Agnidra is a genus of moths belonging to the subfamily Drepaninae.

Species
 Agnidra alextoba Buchsbaum, 2000
 Agnidra argypha Chu & Wang, 1988
 Agnidra ataxia Chu & Wang, 1988
 Agnidra corticata Warren, 1922
 Agnidra discispilaria Moore, 1867
 Agnidra fenestra Leech, 1898
 Agnidra fulvior Watson, 1968
 Agnidra furva Watson, 1968
 Agnidra fuscilinea Watson, 1961
 Agnidra hoenei Watson, 1968
 Agnidra scabiosa Butler, 1877
 Agnidra specularia Walker, 1860
 Agnidra tanyospinosa Chu & Wang, 1988
 Agnidra tigrina Chu & Wang, 1988
 Agnidra vinacea Moore, 1879

References

Drepaninae
Drepanidae genera
Taxa named by Frederic Moore